Reminiscience is the fourth album released by the Norwegian electronica project Ugress. It was released on Tuba Records/Port Azur in 2009.

Track listing
 "AMZ 1974"
 "Chrome Shuriken Dragonfire"
 "Numb"
 "New Shoes Escape Manoeuvre"
 "It Was A Great Year (Movies With Robots)"
 "The Bosporus Incident"
 "Cthulhu's Night Out"
 "Sandtraps"
 "Apocalypse Please Wait Buffering"
 "Sordid Pulse"
 "Malaria 22"
 "Win Without Triumph"

2009 albums
Ugress albums